The men's 800 metres at the 2010 European Athletics Championships was held at the Estadi Olímpic Lluís Companys on 28, 29 and 31 July.

Medalists

Records

Schedule

Results

Round 1
First 3 in each heat (Q) and 4 best performers (q) advance to the Semifinals.

Heat 1

Heat 2

Heat 3

Heat 4

Summary

Semifinals
First 3 in each heat and 2 best performers advance to the Final.

Semifinal 1

Semifinal 2

Summary

Final

References
 Round 1 Results
 Semifinal Results
 Final Results
Full results

800
800 metres at the European Athletics Championships